Imran Aslam is a Pakistani television actor working in Pakistani television & Film industry. Aslam has worked in numerous Pakistani shows and won accolades for his performances including two Hum TV Awards. He was also Nominated Best Actor Lux Style Award for Drama Serial Sanjha

Filmography

Films
 Saawan (2016)

Shows

References

External links
 
 Imran Aslam  at D4Drama
 Imran Aslam at Profilepk.com
 Imran Aslam at Apnatvzone
 Imran Aslam at Showbizpak

Pakistani male television actors
Living people
Male actors from Karachi
Hum Award winners
1981 births